The London Film Academy (LFA) is a UK film school situated in Fulham, London. Founded in 2001, the LFA offers undergraduate, postgraduate and short courses, providing practical training across all key filmmaking disciplines.

History
Based within a converted Methodist Church on Walham Grove, the London Film Academy was founded in 2001. The stated ethos was to produce practical film courses that focused on the art of celluloid filmmaking, with lecturers that were active within the film industry.

In January 2006 the LFA formed a partnership with Club Panico. Panico was created in the mid eighties and has patrons that include Terry Gilliam, Terry Jones and Sir Ben Kingsley. Together with the London Film Academy, Panico now serves as a stepping stone to industry for graduate and post graduate students.

The LFA holds its annual graduation show at the BFI Southbank. Daisy Gili and Anna MacDonald co-founded the Academy and have served as joint principals of the LFA for fifteen years, and remain so as at 2019.

In 2016, Joseph A Adesunloye, an alumnus of the London Film Academy, was shortlisted for the IWC Filmmaker Bursary Award, in association with the BFI.

The London Film Academy announced a scholarship for emerging female filmmakers, worth £23,000, in September 2017.

Accreditation
The London Film Academy was reviewed by the QAA (Quality Assurance Agency for Higher Education) in November 2012, and November 2016. The result, in both instances, was a positive affirmation of LFA standards.

The LFA's Writer-Diploma Course is Creative Skillset Approved.

Tutors
Amongst the academy's tutors are cinematographer Andrew Speller, director David Pope, and screenwriter Kay Stonham.

Partners
The academy's partners include: British Film Institute (BFI), Arri, University of Derby and Anglia Ruskin University (Cambridge Campus).

Courses of study
The academy teaches a variety of courses from a 2-year BA Filmmaking to 1-Day Short courses.

References

External links
 Official Website. Retrieved 2 January 2019.

Film schools in England
Education in the London Borough of Hammersmith and Fulham